Plunketts Creek may refer to:
Plunketts Creek Township, Lycoming County, Pennsylvania
Plunketts Creek (Loyalsock Creek), a tributary of Loyalsock Creek in Pennsylvania
Hillsgrove Township, Sullivan County, Pennsylvania, formerly Plunketts Creek Township
Plunkett Creek (Tennessee) or Plunketts Creek

See also
Plunketts Creek Bridge No. 3, a stone arch bridge over the tributary of Loyalsock Creek, destroyed in a 1996 flood